Vincas Grybas (3 October 1890 – 3 July 1941) was a Lithuanian sculptor. Vincas Grybas was born in Lukšiai village, where he finished elementary school. Later he continued his studies at Warsaw art school. After World War I Grybas extended his studies in Kaunas and Paris. In 1919, he joined the LSDP (Social Democratic Party of Lithuania). After Lithuania was occupied by the Nazi Germany, Grybas was handed over to the Gestapo by the local auxiliary forces and killed in 1941 in Jurbarkas.

Works
Among Vincas Grybas' most famous creations are the monuments to Simonas Daukantas in Seda, Lithuania. He also created a sculpture (restored in 1991) of Vytautas the Great in Kaunas, a sculpture of Petras Vileišis in Pasvalys, and a church altar in Sintautai.

Sources

1890 births
1941 deaths
People from Marijampolė County
20th-century Lithuanian sculptors
Male sculptors
20th-century male artists
Lithuanian people executed by Nazi Germany
Civilians killed in World War II